Schools in Tangalan, Aklan, Philippines. (The list may not be complete)

Tangalan
Schools in Aklan